Marksville High School is a high school located in the city of Marksville, Louisiana, United States. It is a 7th through 12th grade school with 915 students enrolled.

The school dates to 1856, when it was established through the work of superintendent Pierre-Adolphe Lafargue, a native of the Pyrenees Mountains region of France. Lafargue was also a mayor of Marksville.

Academic performance
The school had a 47.7% graduation rate in 2008–09, with a 59.5% drop out rate the previous school year. School Performance Scores (SPS) are given each year by the Louisiana Department of Education. The 2010-11 School Performance Score (SPS) was 45.5, a significant decrease from 2009-2010 which had a SPS score of 73.5. The SPS from 06–07 & 07–08 was 73.5, but declined to 70.1 in 08-09 academic year. Therefore, the school has remained stagnant in growth and performance from 06-10, but the 2010-11 SPS scores mark a decline in growth and performance. Louisiana's goal is for every school to have a SPS of 120 by 2014.

Administration
Marksville High School is run by the Avoyelles Parish School Board. The principal position is currently vacant, and the assistant principals are Eric Dauzat, Cindy Schaub, and Joel Desselle.

Clubs and organizations

 4-H
 Beta Club
 FBLA
 FCS
 FFA
 Jr. Beta Club
 La Gear Up/Explorer's Club
 Publications/Yearbook Staff
 Student Council
 Twirlers
 Falling Band

Athletics
Marksville High athletics competes in the LHSAA.

 Baseball - Varsity
 Basketball - Girls' Varsity
 Basketball - Boys' Varsity
 Cheerleading
 Cheerleading - JH
 Cheerleading - JV
 Danceline
 Danceline-JV
 Football (JV only)
 Softball - Varsity
 Track and field
 Marching band
 Tennis

Notable people
 D'Anthony Batiste - NFL and CFL football player
 Edwin Edwards - four-term Louisiana governor 
 Elaine Edwards - Louisiana senator
 Isaiah Greenhouse - NFL football player
 Raymond Laborde - five-term Louisiana representative
 Chad Lavalais - NFL football player
 Tommy Neck - NFL football player
 John H. Overton - US senator

References

External links 

 Avoyelles Parish School Board

Schools in Avoyelles Parish, Louisiana
Public high schools in Louisiana
Public middle schools in Louisiana

Marksville, Louisiana
1856 establishments in Louisiana